Run is an American comedy thriller television series created by Vicky Jones that premiered on April 12, 2020 on HBO. It stars Merritt Wever and Domhnall Gleeson, and one of its executive producers is Jones' frequent collaborator, Phoebe Waller-Bridge. Runs pilot episode was directed by Kate Dennis.

In July 2020, HBO canceled the series after one season.

Premise

Cast

Main
Merritt Wever as Ruby Richardson, a woman looking to reinvent herself
Domhnall Gleeson as Billy Johnson, a successful life guru

Recurring
Phoebe Waller-Bridge as Laurel Halliday, a woman whom Ruby and Billy meet while on their journey
Rich Sommer as Laurence Richardson, Ruby's husband
Tamara Podemski as Babe Cloud, a police detective
Archie Panjabi as Fiona, Billy's former personal assistant
Shaun J. Brown as Ryan Everwood, a police detective
Jake Bover as Scooter Richardson, Ruby's son
Kelsey Flower as Daniel

Guest
 Stephen McKinley Henderson as John ("Run")
 Annie Golden as Marjorie ("Run")
 Maxwell Simkins as Hunter Richardson ("Chase")
 Deirdre Lovejoy as Mary Dixie ("Fuck")
 Saamer Usmani as Derek ("Kiss")

Episodes

Reception

Critical response
The review aggregator website Rotten Tomatoes reported an 84% approval rating with an average rating of 7.04/10, based on 38 reviews. The website's critical consensus states, "Though it can't always sustain its frenetic pace, Run sharp subversions of romcom clichés are never less than entertaining thanks to Merritt Wever and Domhnall Gleeson's electrifying performances." On Metacritic, it has a weighted average score of 74 out of 100, based on 21 critics, indicating "generally favorable reviews". Alan Sepinwall of Rolling Stone praised the two central performances, with Wever in particular garnering critical acclaim. He wrote that "the heat between them is palpable enough to carry this oddball mix of sexual farce and Alfred Hitchcock thriller".

Ratings

References

External links
 

2020s American black comedy television series
2020 American television series debuts
2020 American television series endings
English-language television shows
HBO original programming
Television series by Entertainment One
American thriller television series